Louise Friberg may refer to:

Louise Edlind Friberg (born 1946), Swedish actress and politician
Louise Friberg (golfer) (born 1980),  Swedish golfer